Nemomydas is a genus of mydas flies in the family Mydidae. There are at least 20 described species in Nemomydas.

Species
These 23 species belong to the genus Nemomydas:

 Nemomydas alifoleyae Fitzgerald & Kondratieff, 1998 c g
 Nemomydas bequaerti (Johnson, 1926) c g
 Nemomydas bifidus Hardy, 1950 i c g
 Nemomydas brachyrhynchus (Osten Sacken, 1886) i c g b
 Nemomydas desideratus (Johnson, 1912) i c g
 Nemomydas dominicanus Kondratieff & Perez-Gelabert, 2004 c g
 Nemomydas fronki Kondratieff and Welch, 1990 i c g
 Nemomydas fumosus Hardy, 1950 i c g
 Nemomydas hooki Welch & Kondratieff, 1991 c g
 Nemomydas intonsus Hardy, 1950 i c g
 Nemomydas jonesii (Johnson, 1926) i c g
 Nemomydas lamia (Seguy, 1928) c g
 Nemomydas lara Steyskal, 1956 i c g
 Nemomydas loreni Welch, 1991 c g
 Nemomydas melanopogon Steyskal, 1956 i c g b
 Nemomydas panamensis (Curran, 1934) c g
 Nemomydas pantherinus (Gerstacker, 1868) i c g b
 Nemomydas senilis (Westwood, 1841) c g
 Nemomydas solitarius (Johnson, 1926) i c g
 Nemomydas sponsor (Osten Sacken, 1886) c g
 Nemomydas tenuipes (Loew, 1872) i c g b
 Nemomydas venosus (Loew, 1866) i c g b
 Nemomydas wendyae Kondratieff & Welch, 1990 c g

Data sources: i = ITIS, c = Catalogue of Life, g = GBIF, b = Bugguide.net

References

Further reading

 

Mydidae
Articles created by Qbugbot
Asiloidea genera